The LG-GC900 (known and marketed as the LG Viewty Smart) is a mobile phone manufactured by LG Electronics. It was released in June 2009 as successor to the LG Viewty (KU990). It features the S-Class UI that was introduced on the LG Arena.

References

GC900
Mobile phones introduced in 2009